Darren Kandler, better known by his Stage name Klashnekoff (pronounced K-Lash-Nek-Off) or Ricochet Klashnekoff, is a Jamaican-English Rapper from Stoke Newington, London. Klashnekoff was born in Hornsey, but then moved to Hackney in London where he began his career in rapping. He was the founding member of the Terra Firma Crew.

His debut album, The Sagas Of..., includes the singles "Murda" produced by UK producer Harry Love (which was later released on the movie album Kidulthood), "Zero", "All I Got" and "Black Rose'" and was released in 2004. Afterwards he released/ Lionheart: Tussle with the Beast,  on 26 February 2007. Klashnekoff's last album was released on 12 April 2010 and is called Back to the Sagas. He was nominated for the 2007 BET award for best U.K. Hip-Hop artist.

Discography

Albums
 The Sagas Of... (2004, Kemet)
 Lionheart: Tussle with the Beast (2007, Riddim Killa)
 Back to the Sagas (2010, Abstract Urban)
 Iona (2019, S.O.N)

Mixtapes
 Focus Mode (2005, Altered Ego)
 Fu*k the Long Talk (2012, S.O.N Entertainment)

Sources

References

External links
 Klashnekoff on Discogs
 Klashnekoff on ITunes

1975 births
Living people
English hip hop musicians
English male rappers
English people of Jamaican descent
People from Hackney Central
People from Hornsey
Rappers from London